= Jo Smith (writer) =

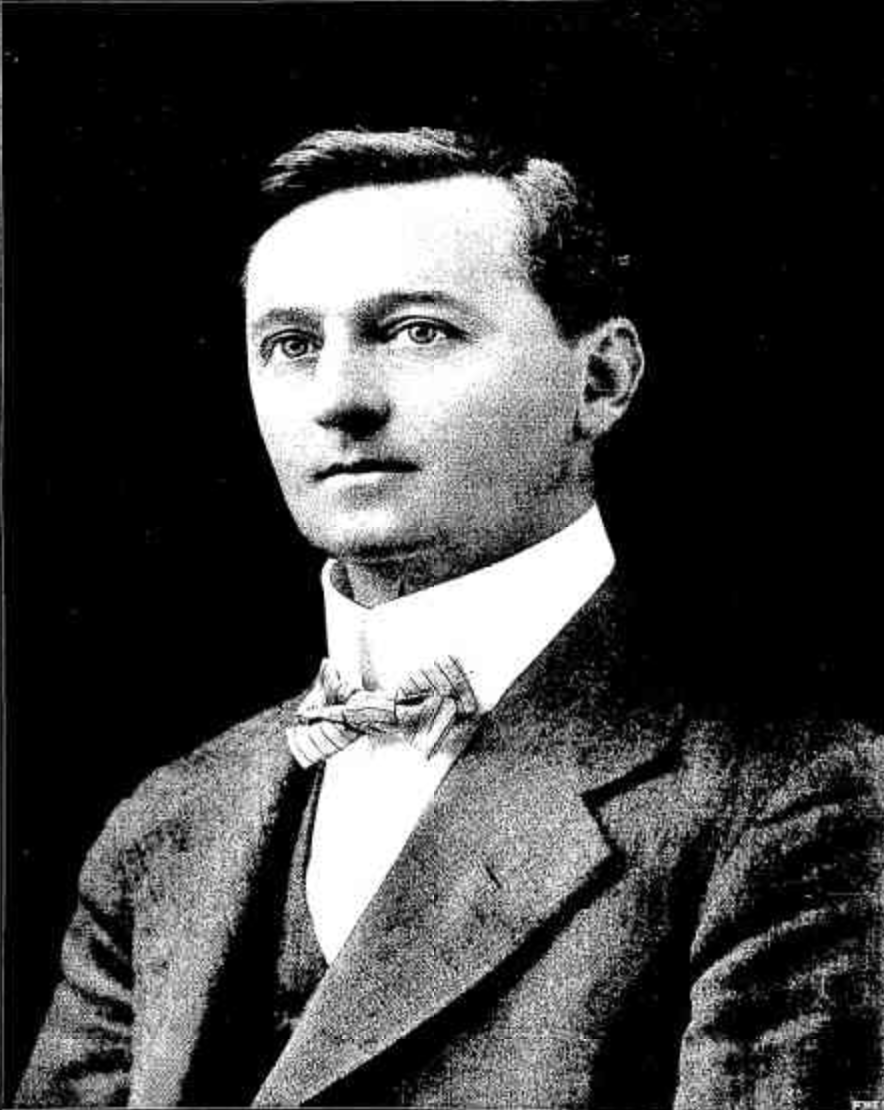
- Smith in 1913
- Born: Joseph O. Smith; 1868 Richmond, Victoria, Australia
- Died: 2 December 1954 (aged 85–86) Toorak, Victoria, Australia
- Occupation: Playwright, actor and businessman

Jo Smith (1868 – 2 December 1954) was an Australian playwright who wrote a number of popular melodramas.

Smith was born in Richmond in 1868. He worked as an actor, writer and businessman. His first play was The Miner's Trust. He wrote several successful plays.

Smith donated money from his plays Before the Dawn and The Reveille to soldier organisations.

He left the stage after acting on tour in the 1890s and went into the furniture business and was successful.

Smith died in Toorak on 2 December 1954. He was survived by two daughters.

== Select plays ==
- The Miner's Trust (1908)
- The Bushwoman (1909)
- The Girl of the Never Never (1912)
- Before the Dawn (1915)
- The Reveille (1917)
